Gretchena ochrantennae is a species of moth of the family Tortricidae. It is found in Morona-Santiago Province, Ecuador.

The wingspan is about 19 mm. The forewings are brownish, sprinkled with brown, with groups of white scales and brownish-cream costal strigulae (fine streaks). The hindwings are dirty white, mixed with pale brownish in the apical area.

Etymology
The species name refers to the colouration of the flagellum of the antenna and is derived Latin chreous and antenna.

References

Moths described in 2006
Eucosmini